"No Time Like the Past" is episode 112 of the American television anthology series The Twilight Zone. In this episode a man tries to escape the troubles of the 20th century by taking up residence in an idyllic small town in the 19th century.

Opening narration

Plot
Disgusted with 20th century problems such as world wars, atomic weapons and radioactive poisoning, Paul Driscoll solicits the help of his colleague Harvey and uses a time machine, intent to remake the present by altering past events.

Paul first travels to Hiroshima on August 6, 1945 and attempts to warn a Hiroshima police captain about the atomic bomb, but the captain dismisses him as insane. Paul then travels to a Berlin hotel room to assassinate Adolf Hitler in August 1939 (immediately before the outbreak of World War II the following month), but is interrupted when a housekeeper knocks on his door and later calls two SS guards to his room. On his third stop, Paul tries to change the course of the Lusitania on May 6, 1915 to avoid being torpedoed by a German U-boat, but the ship’s captain questions his credibility.

Paul accepts the hypothesis that the past cannot be changed. He then uses the time machine to go to the town of Homeville, Indiana in 1881, resolving not to make any changes, but just to live out his life free of the problems of the modern age. Upon his arrival, he realizes that President James A. Garfield will be shot the next day, but resists the temptation to intervene. He stays at a boarding house in town and meets Abigail Sloan, a teacher. At one of the boarding house’s dinners, a boarder named Hanford vehemently espouses American imperialism. Paul delivers an angry rebuttal in which he accuses Hanford of speaking from ignorance of war and a certainty that he himself will not have to take part in any fighting, while dropping numerous allusions to wars that have yet to take place. Abigail is impressed and privately tells him that she shares his views, having lost her father and two brothers in the American Civil War. He kisses Abigail, but she becomes alienated when he refuses to explain his earlier remarks about future wars.

A passing remark from a local musician jogs a memory from Paul's vast historical knowledge: Homeville's schoolhouse will burn down because of a kerosene lantern ejected from a runaway wagon, badly injuring twelve children. He resolves to keep his vow not to change the past, but when he spies the lantern in question he tries to unhitch the horses. The resulting altercation with the wagon owner causes the horses to run wild, inadvertently causing the fire he intended to prevent.

Afterward, Paul tells Abigail that "the past is sacred" and belongs to those who are native to it. He knows too much of the future and fears that he will inevitably cause more mishaps like the schoolhouse fire because of it. He returns to his own time and declares that instead of continuing to fixate upon the past, he will now try to do something to positively impact the future.

Closing narration

Notes
In the Twilight Zone radio drama series with Stacy Keach as the narrator, the first three time travel destinations perpetrated by Driscoll are inverted. He first attempts to board the Lusitania, then attempts to assassinate Hitler, and finally attempts to warn and evacuate Hiroshima. The rest of the story matches with the TV script.

Cast
Dana Andrews as Paul Driscoll
Patricia Breslin as Abigail Sloan
Robert F. Simon as Harvey
Malcolm Atterbury as Professor Eliot
Marjorie Bennett as Mrs. Chamberlain
James Yagi as Japanese Police Captain
Tudor Owen as Captain of 'Lusitania'
John Zaremba as Horn Player
Robert O. Cornthwaite as Hanford
Lindsay Workman as Bartender

See also
Fatalism
Back There and Of Late I Think of Cliffordville – other The Twilight Zone episodes about a man who tries to change history by traveling to the past.
Profile in Silver - an episode from the 1985 The Twilight Zone series about trying to change history by traveling to the past.

References
DeVoe, Bill. (2008). Trivia from The Twilight Zone. Albany, GA: Bear Manor Media. 
Grams, Martin. (2008). The Twilight Zone: Unlocking the Door to a Television Classic. Churchville, MD: OTR Publishing.

External links

1963 American television episodes
The Twilight Zone (1959 TV series season 4) episodes
Television episodes about time travel
Television episodes written by Rod Serling
Fiction set in 1881
Fiction set in 1915
Fiction set in 1939
Fiction set in 1945
Works about the atomic bombings of Hiroshima and Nagasaki
Television episodes set in Indiana
Cultural depictions of Adolf Hitler
Television episodes about World War II
Television episodes set in Berlin
Television episodes set in Japan
Television episodes about nuclear war and weapons
Japan in non-Japanese culture
Television episodes about wars